"Home" is a song from American musician Sheryl Crow's 1996 self-titled album. Written and produced by Crow, the folk ballad was released as the final single from the album on October 6, 1997, and was later included on her greatest hits album The Very Best of Sheryl Crow (2003). It was released commercially only in Europe. "Home" became Crow's ninth top-40 hit in both Canada and the United Kingdom, peaking at numbers 40 and 25, respectively. A black-and-white music video directed by Samuel Bayer was made for the song.

Composition
"Home" is described as a folk ballad by Sal Cinquemani of Slant Magazine, and its lyrics talk about the stresses of a failing marriage. According to the digital sheet music published at Musicnotes, "Home" is written in the key of G major and plays in common time at a slow tempo of 80 beats per minute.

Critical reception
Larry Flick from Billboard wrote, "After several rock-fueled singles, Crow drops the volume and tempo to a soft-rock tone for this harshly intimate tune. Her hushed, evocative vocal proves that ya don't have to shriek to stir a listener's emotions. In fact, her whispered line "my house is full of lies" is about as intense or powerful as anything you're likely to hear right now. She is supported by an accessible shuffle beat and guitar lines that mingle warm, acoustic threads with sharp, bluesy electric licks. Any station that played the hit "Strong Enough" has no excuse but to give this superior recording a fair shot."

Release and chart performance
Although "Home" was serviced to American radio stations on September 30, 1997, it failed to appear on any Billboard charts; however, it did chart in Canada. On November 3, 1997, the song debuted at number 63 on Canada's RPM Top Singles chart. Afterwards, it rose and fell inside the top 60 until climbing to its peak of number 40 on January 12, 1998. It then dropped to number 87 the following issue, its final week on the ranking. It was also aired on Canadian adult contemporary stations, eventually reaching a peak of number 43 on the RPM Adult Contemporary listing. On October 6, 1997, "Home" was released in the United Kingdom, debuting at its peak of number 25 on the UK Singles Chart six days later and spending two weeks in the top 100.

Music video
The black-and-white music video for the song was directed by Samuel Bayer, and features Crow performing on a village car racing festival. Several villagers are portrayed, sharing their definitions of what 'home' is for them with the viewer. At the end of the video, Crow ends up covered in mud thrown around by the racing cars.

Track listings

UK CD1
 "Home" (album version)
 "Strong Enoug" (WXRT live)
 "Sweet Rosalyn" (live from Shepherd's Bush Empire in London) – 5:16
 "I Shall Believe" (WXRT live)

UK CD2
 "Home" (album version)
 "Hard to Make a Stand" (WXRT live)
 "Can't Cry Anymore" (WXRT live)
 "Redemption Day" (WXRT live)

UK CD-ROM single
 "Home" (album version)
 "Sweet Rosalyn" (CD-ROM of home video)

European CD single
 "Home" (album version) – 4:51
 "Sweet Rosalyn" (live from Shepherd's Bush Empire in London) – 5:16

Credits and personnel
Credits are lifted from the UK CD1 liner notes and the Sheryl Crow album booklet.

Studios
 Recorded at Kingsway Studios (New Orleans) and Sunset Sound (Los Angeles)
 Mastered at Gateway Mastering (Portland, Maine, US)

Personnel

 Sheryl Crow – writing, bass, Wurlitzer, production
 Jeff Trott – guitar
 Brian MacLeod – drums

 Trina Shoemaker – recording
 Tchad Blake – mixing
 Bob Ludwig – mastering

Charts

Release history

References

1990s ballads
1996 songs
1997 singles
American folk songs
Black-and-white music videos
Folk ballads
Music videos directed by Samuel Bayer
Sheryl Crow songs
Songs about marriage
Songs written by Sheryl Crow